Lebršnik is a mountain in the municipality of Gacko, East Herzegovina, at the border of Bosnia and Herzegovina and Montenegro.

See also
List of mountains in Bosnia and Herzegovina

References

Mountains of Bosnia and Herzegovina
Mountains of Montenegro